Jhorda is a village in Nagaur, a tehsil of Nagaur district in Rajasthan, India. According to a census conducted in 2011, the population of Jhorda is 1163 people, with 553 females and 610 males, including 261 families.

The village is located about 35 Km north of Nagaur. Jorda is known for being the birthplace of KandanKalpit ( डब डब भरिया बाईसा रा नैन ), a well-known poet, and of the saint Baba Hariram. A tourist hot spot is the Baba Hariram Temple. The village itself is located just 35 KM north of Nagaur.

References 

 Villages in Nagaur district